Old Ford Dairy is a historic home located near Odessa, New Castle County, Delaware.  It was built about 1850, and was a -story, five-bay by two-bay frame, double cross-gable, vernacular Victorian farmhouse.  It had a rear wing, three-bay front porch, and two brick gable end chimneys. Also on the property were a drive through, -story granary, a rectangular grain storage bin, and a three-story gambrel-roofed dairy barn.

It was listed on the National Register of Historic Places in 1985.

References

Houses on the National Register of Historic Places in Delaware
Victorian architecture in Delaware
Houses completed in 1850
Houses in New Castle County, Delaware
National Register of Historic Places in New Castle County, Delaware